Anna Maria Sofiana (born 11 March 1964), well known as Anna Maria Marten, is an Indonesian model and a wife of Indonesian actor Roy Marten.

Career
A Malay-Sundanese woman started as a model in the beginning of the 1980s, she is the seventh of eight children of Hasan Kartadi and Emma Natadi. She converted to Christianity after her marriage with Roy Marten in 1985. She kept active in her modelling career until beginning 1990s.
In 2006, she was back to the entertainment world, returning to her first profession, as a model. At first, she was chosen as new commercial star of a herbal product preceded by Sophia Latjuba, Rhenald Kasali, Wynne Prakusya, Setiawan Djodi, Dewa Band, Subronto Laras, Nia Ramadhani, Nana and Naysila Mirdad, Ikang Fawzi and Marissa Haque, Gunawan, Cici Tegal, also Lula Kamal.

Personal life 
Marten married her husband on 1 April 1985, although both did not receive the blessing of her parents. They met at the first time in a fashion show in 1984. Although, Roy Marten was a widower with four children with a big age difference about 12 years, it does not a matter for them to be united.

From her marriage, she has two children Merari Sabati and Gibran Marten, also four children from her husband's previous marriage, Monique, Aline, Galih, and Gading Marten.

She, along with her family are Orthodox Christians and members of the Eastern Orthodox Church.

References

External links 
 Profile in KapanLagi.com

1964 births
Indonesian female models
Eastern Orthodox Christians from Indonesia
Sundanese people
Indonesian former Muslims
Converts to Eastern Orthodoxy
Converts to Eastern Orthodoxy from Islam
Indonesian people of Malay descent
People from Cianjur
Living people
People from Jakarta